The Finnish Institute in the UK and Ireland, formerly the Finnish Institute in London (Suomen Britannian- ja Irlannin-instituutti) is a non-profit, private foundation, funded principally by the Finnish Ministry of Education and Culture. It is part of the international network of 17 Finnish Cultural and Academic Institutes, and operates in the United Kingdom, the Republic of Ireland and Finland. The Institute runs two programmes: Arts and Society. The Institute belongs to the Team Finland network that supports Finnish diplomacy, business and culture abroad. The institute is a member of EUNIC London, the network of EU member state cultural institutes.

About 

The Finnish Institute in the UK and Ireland is an expert on Finnish culture and society. The institute supports the internationalisation of Finnish contemporary art and helps artists, researchers and social and cultural actors to create international networks. It also builds partnerships between Irish, British and Finnish actors and organisations. The Institute encourages interdisciplinary and transnational collaboration by creating networks and building new partnerships.

History 

The Finnish Institute in London was founded in 1991. In January 2021, the Institute changed its name to Finnish Institute in the UK and Ireland.

Directors
 Eino Lyytinen 1991–1993
 Jaakko Rusama 1993–1996
 Henrik Stenius 1996–1999
 Panu Minkkinen 1999–2002
 Timo Valjakka 2002–2005
 Seppo Kimanen 2005–2008
 Raija Koli 2008–2013
 Susanna Pettersson 2013–2014
 Johanna Vakkari October 2014–January 2015
 Pauliina Ståhlberg 2015–2018
 Emilie Gardberg 2018–2020
 Jaakko Nousiainen 2021–

References

External links 
 
 Embassy of Finland, London

Education in London
Cultural organisations based in London
Arts centres in London
Cultural promotion organizations